The 1900 Summer Olympics took place in Paris, France, and was the first time ever that golf debuted in the Olympics. Two golf events were contested, individual events for men and women. As with most other events in the 1900 Olympics, few, if any, of the competitors had any idea that they were competing in an Olympic Games.

Format
The men's division consisted of a 36-hole stroke play tournament, while the women's division consisted of only a 9-hole stroke play tournament.

Location
The men's and women's event took place at the Compiègne Club, which is about 50 km (30 miles) north of Paris. This golf club was built in 1896 and is one of few golf courses built outside Great Britain or Ireland in the 19th century. The golf course was designed by M.W. Freemantle and built within the horse racing track of Compiègne. The layout of the course is flat, with dense rough surrounding the fairways and very tiny "postage stamp" sized greens.

Tournament play
The men's tournament was played on 2 October 1900 where they played two 18-hole rounds back-to-back. The following day, 3 October 1900, the women's tournament began, where they only played 9 holes.

Men's division
Charles Sands, representative of the St. Andrews Golf Club in Yonkers, New York finished the 36 hole tournament with 82-85 defeating Walter Rutherford of Jedburgh, Scotland by a mere one stroke. Finishing third for the men's division and receiving the bronze medal was David Robertson. Sands started playing golf in 1895 and three months later participated and made it to the final round of the first U.S. Amateur only to be beaten badly by Charles B. MacDonald. The only other golf tournament Sands ever competed in was the 1900 Summer Olympics.

Women's division
The women's division was a stage for many firsts that occurred in the Olympic games. Not only was this the first time women were ever able to compete in the Olympic games, the women's division was won by Margaret Abbott of Chicago Golf Club. Abbott shot a 47 to win and became the first ever American female to win a gold medal in the Olympic Games, though she received a gilded porcelain bowl as a prize instead of a medal. She is also the second overall American woman to receive an Olympic medal. Abbott's mother, Mary Abbott, also competed in this Olympic event and finished tied for seventh, shooting a 65. They were the first and only mother and daughter that have ever competed in the same Olympic event at the same time.

Margaret never knew that they were competing in the Olympics; she thought it was a normal golf tournament and died not knowing. Her historic victory was not known until University of Florida professor Paula Welch began to do research into the history of the Olympics and discovered that Margaret Abbott had placed first. Over the course of ten years, she contacted Abbott's children and informed them of their mother's victory.

Medal summary

Participating nations
A total of 22 golfers from 4 nations competed at the Paris Games:

Medal table

References

 International Olympic Committee medal winners database
 De Wael, Herman. Herman's Full Olympians: "Golf 1900". Accessed 27 January 2006.

See also
List of Olympic medalists in golf

 
1900 Summer Olympics events
1900
Golf tournaments in France
1900 in golf